Daniel Dantas may refer to:
Daniel Dantas (actor) (born 1954), Brazilian actor
Daniel Dantas (entrepreneur), Brazilian entrepreneur